Dakota (specimen NDGS 2000) is the nickname given to an important Edmontosaurus fossil found in the Hell Creek Formation in North Dakota. It is about 67 million years old, placing it in the Maastrichtian, the last stage of the Cretaceous period. It was about 12 m (40 ft) long and weighed about 7-8 tons.

The fossil is unusual and scientifically valuable because soft tissue including skin and muscle have been fossilized, giving researchers the rare opportunity to study more than bones, as with most vertebrate fossils. Preliminary research results indicate that hadrosaurs had heavier tails and were able to run faster than was previously thought.

Discovery and analysis

Dakota was first discovered by paleontology student Tyler Lyson on his family's North Dakota property in 1999 while he was a high school student, but he did not investigate the site in detail until 2004, when he discovered the soft tissue preservation. Lyson teamed with British paleontologist Phillip Manning, and the site was excavated in summer 2006.

Manning's team used a large-scale CT scanner, provided by NASA and the Boeing Company, to generate high-resolution scans of the preserved muscles and tendons of the rear legs. Because the intervertebral discs which space out the spinal column of the tail have been fossilized, researchers have been able to calculate its length more accurately. The preservation of its muscles and tendons allow the calculation of its mass.

The well-preserved integument has retained its texture, and researchers have mapped it in three dimensions. The scales are of different sizes, and researchers speculate that their pattern may reflect the animal's coloration in life. For example, areas of an arm's joints are textured in what resembles a striped pattern. This fossil's examination was the subject of Dino Autopsy, a documentary aired on National Geographic Channel on December 9, 2007.

The specimen was previously housed at the Marmarth Research Foundation (MRF) under the catalog number MRF-3, but now it is permanently part of the collection of the North Dakota Geological Survey located at the State of North Dakota, under the specimen number/catalogue NDGS 2000.

Taphonomy
 
Dinosaur fossils with Dakota's degree of preservation are extremely rare because many different factors must come together to allow it to occur. The carcass first must escape scavengers as well as degradation by the elements. The soft tissue must then be mineralized before it decomposes. Finally, as with all fossils, the mineralized body must escape destruction by geological forces over millions of years. News reports have referred to Dakota as "mummified"; however, it is actually a fossil of a mummified dinosaur, where the animal's dried tissues have been transformed to rock through fossilization.

Stephanie K. Drumheller and team in 2022 proposed that Dakota was exceptionally preserved because of several identified scavenging marks to the carcass, which helped to escape the gases, fluids, and microbes that develop during decomposition. This may have likely allowed soft tissues to withstand the weeks and/or months required for desiccation prior to burial and eventual fossilization.

See also

 Timeline of hadrosaur research
 Edmontosaurus mummy AMNH 5060
 Edmontosaurus mummy SMF R 4036
 Dueling Dinosaurs

References

External links
 
 

1999 in paleontology
Cretaceous fossil record
Dinosaur fossils
Late Cretaceous dinosaurs of North America
Paleontology in North Dakota
Saurolophines